Jack Henry Philip Taylor (born 23 June 1998) is a professional footballer who plays for Peterborough United. Born in England, he has represented Ireland at youth level.

Club career
Taylor was in the youth team at Chelsea for seven years, before joining Barnet in 2012. He made his senior debut as a 15 year old when he came on as substitute in a 3–1 Herts Senior Cup win over Hatfield Town on 3 December 2013. He signed a two-year professional contract in April 2016, making his professional debut for the first team on 4 October 2016 in an EFL Trophy match against Norwich City.

Taylor joined Hampton & Richmond Borough on loan for a month on 28 October 2016. He was recalled from loan in December, and made his league debut against Yeovil Town on 10 December.

After being a standout player for Barnet in the early stages of the 2019–20 season, he joined Peterborough United on 7 January 2020 for an initial fee of £500,000.

International career
Taylor is eligible to play for the Republic of Ireland due to his grandfather being from county Longford in Ireland and he's had Irish citizenship since birth. Taylor was called up to the Republic of Ireland U21 squad for the 2019 Toulon Tournament in June 2019. Taylor scored a brace in a training match against the senior team on 30 May 2019. He made his debut as a substitute against Bahrain U23 on 9 June. He received his first senior call-up in November 2020 for a UEFA Nations League match against Bulgaria. On 1 September 2021, he was named FAI Under-21 International Player of the Year for 2020.

Personal life
Taylor also holds Irish citizenship. His grandfather is from County Longford in Ireland. Taylor's older brother Harry (born 1997) was also in the youth team at Chelsea and is now a professional at Southend United.

Career statistics

Honours
Individual
FAI Under-21 International Player of the Year: 2020

References

External links

1998 births
Living people
English people of Irish descent
English footballers
Republic of Ireland association footballers
Republic of Ireland youth international footballers
Chelsea F.C. players
Barnet F.C. players
Hampton & Richmond Borough F.C. players
Peterborough United F.C. players
English Football League players
National League (English football) players
Association football midfielders
Footballers from Hammersmith